Kyrinsky District is an administrative and municipal district (raion), one of the thirty-one in Zabaykalsky Krai, Russia. It is located in the southwest of the krai, and borders with Ulyotovsky District in the north. Its administrative center is the rural locality (a selo) of Kyra. Population:  16,016 (2002 Census);  The population of Kyra accounts for 33.4% of the district's total population.

Geography
The Khentei-Daur Highlands are located in the eastern part of the district.

History
The district was established on January 4, 1926.

References

Notes

Sources

Districts of Zabaykalsky Krai
States and territories established in 1926

